Leveraging Agriculture for Improving Nutrition and Health is the title of a global policy consultation and international conference to be held in New Delhi, India from 10–12 February 2011, which will examine the linkages between work undertaken in the agriculture, nutrition and health sectors. The conference is organized by the International Food Policy Research Institute (IFPRI) with support from the Asian Development Bank, the Bill and Melinda Gates Foundation, Deutsche Gesellschaft für Technische Zusammenarbeit (GTZ), the Indian Economic Association, IDRC, PepsiCo, UK Department for International Development (DFID), United States Agency for International Development (USAID), Feed the Future Initiative, and The World Bank.

Linkages between Agriculture, Nutrition and Health
Agricultural products are not only sources of energy and nutrients, but also sources of fuel, medicine, fiber, and lumber. Agriculture as an activity is also the source of livelihood and income for much of the world’s population, especially those living in rural areas. For this reason, agriculture has a considerable, positive impact on health and nutrition.

On the downside, agriculture has many negative effects on health. Agricultural production, trade, and distribution can negatively affect the environment through pesticide and fertilizer runoff polluting the soil and ground water. According to WHO, around 1.1 billion people still lack access to safe drinking water.

Other negative effects include health and environmental risks to producers and laborers by being exposed to bad weather, handling chemical and biological products, working long hours, or using dangerous agricultural machinery.

Conversely, health and nutrition can also influence agriculture. Poor health affects farm productivity and household income, creating a vicious circle of poverty, food insecurity, and ill health.

The Policy Consultation and Conference

Rationale
The goal of the policy consultation is to overcome the isolation of policymakers and practitioners working in the agriculture, nutrition, and health sectors and to leverage the strong interactions and synergies among these sectors. In view of the problems many poor countries face to achieve the Millennium Development Goals (MDGs) by 2015, the initiative hopes to consolidate information and build consensus for a joint action leveraging agriculture to improve nutrition and health.

Process and Events
The process started in October and November 2010 with three seminars in Washington, DC. Besides the lead-in seminars and the main conference in February 2011 in India, the consultation also includes a youth writing contest in which young people between 14 and 18 years of age can submit thoughts and ideas on how to change agriculture to produce better food and lead to better health.

The seminars in October and November 2010 were:
 2010 Global Hunger Index: Focus on the Crisis of Child Undernutrition on October 14, 2010
 Understanding the Interactions between Agriculture and Health on October 28, 2010
 Nourishing Plants and People: New Insights on How Fertilizers Affect Agriculture, Nutrition, and Health on November 19, 2010

Other Initiatives and Resources
 Agricultural Health Study sponsored by the National Institutes of Health
 Agriculture & Health Research Platform
 The Agriculture and Public Health Gateway
 The Nutrition Collaborative Research Support Program (Nutrition CRSP)

Further reading
Literature on Agriculture, Nutrition and Health on Science Direct
Agriculture, Nutrition and Health Literature on Google Scholar

References

Agricultural policy
Science conferences
Agricultural health and safety
Food science institutes
Food politics
Agrarian politics
Malnutrition organizations